Seagulls Die in the Harbour is a 1955 Belgian drama film directed by Rik Kuypers, Ivo Michiels and Roland Verhavert, for which Jack Sels wrote the soundtrack. The film was entered into the 1956 Cannes Film Festival.

Plot
A man (Julien Schoenaerts, Matthias Schoenaerts’s father) is seen wandering around in Antwerp, avoiding all contact with other people. He is penniless and desperately wants to leave the country, but can't pay for his enshipment. The only people who like him are the boatman's wife (Tine Balder), a prostitute (Dora van der Groen) and a little orphan girl called Gigi (Gisèle Peeters). Gradually but surely it becomes clear why he is hiding and why he needs to flee.

Cast
 Tine Balder as the boatman's wife 
 Tone Brulin as the pimp
 Alice De Graef
 Jenny Deheyder
 Piet Frison as the boatman
 Désiré Kaesen
 Robert Kaesen (as Bob Kaesen)
 Gisèle Peeters as the orphan girl (as Gigi)
 Eric Peter
 Marcel Philippe
 Julien Schoenaerts as the stranger
 Paul S'Jongers
 Panchita Van de Perre
 Dora van der Groen as the prostitute
 Albert Van der Sanden
 Miriam Verbeeck
 Geneviève Wayenbergh

References

External links

1955 films
Belgian drama films
1950s Dutch-language films
1955 drama films
Belgian black-and-white films
Films set in Antwerp
Films shot in Antwerp
Films directed by Roland Verhavert
Dutch-language Belgian films